Africa Media Review is a peer-reviewed academic journal covering communication theory, practice, and policy in Africa. It is a collaborative publication between the Council for the Development of Social Science Research in Africa (CODESRIA) based in Dakar, Senegal and the African Council for Communication Education (ACCE) in Nairobi, Kenya.

External links 
 Homepage Africa Media Review 2004 - 
 Fulltext 1986-1997, via Michigan State University Libraries, African e-Journals Project
 Electronic Journals Library (EZB)
 AtoZ electronic journals focused on Africa (NAI)
 African Journals Online (AJOL)

African studies
Publications established in 1986
Media studies journals
Academic journals published in Africa
Council for the Development of Social Science Research in Africa academic journals